The 1993 NCAA Men's Water Polo Championship was the 25th annual NCAA Men's Water Polo Championship to determine the national champion of NCAA men's collegiate water polo. Tournament matches were played at the Belmont Plaza Pool in Long Beach, California during December 1993.

Stanford defeated USC in the final, 11–9, to win their seventh national title. The Cardinal (24–6) were coached by Dante Dettamanti

Neither a Most Outstanding Player nor an All-Tournament Team was named this year.

The tournament's leading scorer, with 13 goals, was Michael Nalu from UC San Diego.

Qualification
Since there has only ever been one single national championship for water polo, all NCAA men's water polo programs (whether from Division I, Division II, or Division III) were eligible. A total of 8 teams were invited to contest this championship.

Bracket
Site: Belmont Plaza Pool, Long Beach, California

See also 
 NCAA Men's Water Polo Championship

References

NCAA Men's Water Polo Championship
NCAA Men's Water Polo Championship
December 1993 sports events in the United States
NCAA Men's Water Polo Championship